Brygophis is a genus of snake in the family Pseudoxyrhophiidae (subfamily Pseudoxyrhophiinae). The genus is monotypic, containing the sole species Brygophis coulangesi, which is endemic to Madagascar.

Etymology
The generic name, Brygophis, is in honor of French herpetologist Édouard-Raoul Brygoo.

The specific name, coulangesi, is in honor of French epidemiologist Pierre Coulanges.

Habitat

Behavior
B. coulangesi is arboreal.

Diet
B. coulangesi preys upon frogs and small mammals.

Reproduction
B. coulangesi is oviparous.

References

Further reading
Andreone F, Raxworthy CJ (1998). "The colubrid snake Brygophis coulangesi (Domergue, 1988) rediscovered in north-eastern Madagascar". Tropical Zoology 11 (2): 249–257.
Domergue C (1988). "Notes sur les serpents de la région malgache. 8. Colubridae nouveaux ". Bulletin du Muséum d'Histoire Naturelle de Paris, Section A Zoologie Biologie et Ecologie Animales 10 (1): 135–146. (Perinetia coulangesi, new species, p. 135). (in French).
Domergue C, Bour R (1989). "Brygophis nom nouveaux pour Perinetia Domergue, 1988, préemployé (Reptilia, Colubridae)". Bull. Mus. d'Hist. Nat. Paris, Sect. A Zool. Biol. Ecol. Anim. 10 (4): 805–806. (Brygophis, new generic name; B. coulangesi, new combination). (in French).
Glaw F, Vences M (2006). A Field Guide to the Amphibians and Reptiles of Madagascar, Third Edition. Cologne, Germany: Vences & Glaw Verlag. 496 pp. .

Pseudoxyrhophiidae
Monotypic snake genera
Snakes of Africa
Reptiles of Madagascar
Endemic fauna of Madagascar
Taxa named by Charles Domergue